Asahi Station is the name of four train stations in Japan:

 Asahi Station (Chiba) (旭駅)
 Asahi Station (Kōchi) (旭駅)
 Asahi Station (Mie) (朝日駅)
 Ise-Asahi Station (伊勢朝日駅)
 Asahi Station (Nagano) (朝陽駅)

See also
 Hizen-Asahi Station, on the Kagoshima Main Line in Tosu, Saga